Rick Wulle (born 4 June 1994) is a German professional footballer who plays as a goalkeeper.

References

External links
 

Living people
1994 births
German footballers
Association football goalkeepers
FC Astoria Walldorf players
SV Sandhausen players
2. Bundesliga players
Regionalliga players
Sportspeople from Heidelberg
Footballers from Baden-Württemberg